Robert Wayne Rainey, born March 16, 1966, is a director/photographer, and artistic community activist based in Phoenix, Arizona.

Educated and trained over in over 25 years of practical experience, Wayne Rainey's professional background includes mostly filmmaking and photography. He has specialized in commercial fields such as food, lifestyles, resort, and major production advertising. Aside from his commercial career, Rainey's reputation in the arts world is made evident through major exhibitions and reviews of his work in publications including ArtNews, Communication Arts, Art in America, and Photo District News.

Rainey has traveled extensively in Africa, Europe, and North and South America. It is through this travel that he distills a profound perspective and vision that is common throughout his imagery. Combined with his love for the southwest, Rainey has cultivated a unique understanding and appreciation for observing and photographing people and the environments they inhabit.

Rainey is active in his hometown cultural district, where he has implemented numerous projects to revitalize the downtown area, including some of the very first affordable live/work facilities for artists with Holga's Artist's apartments, and a multi-disciplinary creative consortium realized in the monOrchid building.

He was also executive publisher of Shade, an urban arts magazine, and truly understands the process of moving an idea to a finished project/publication. His commercial work is recognized throughout the world and he won numerous accolades including Addy Awards, an Award of Excellence from the prestigious Communication Arts, Photo District News and the Alternative Pick. Rainey's active presence in the community is apparent by his memberships on various neighborhood and downtown boards including serving as an Arts Commissioner for the City of Phoenix, and a board member with the Phoenix Art Museum and was hailed an urban pioneer by the Arizona Republic

Exhibitions
Profiles’, Solo Exhibition, Bokeh Gallery, Phoenix 2011
‘Pre-Summer Solstice’, Annual Art Auction, Phoenix, 2011
‘Summer Solstice’, Annual Art Auction, Phoenix, 2010
‘Arts Fete’, Group Exhibition, MonOrchid Gallery, Phoenix 2009
‘Africa Series’, Solo Exhibition, Bentley Gallery, Scottsdale, 2003
‘Desert Landscapes’, Group Exhibition, Bentley Gallery, Scottsdale, 2001
Group Exhibition, Shemer Art Center, Phoenix, 2000
Short Film Director, Hospice of the Valley, Phoenix, 2010
Photographer, Southwest Human Development, Phoenix, 2009-2010
Instructor, Phoenix College, Phoenix, 2007
Guest Juror, School of Architecture and Landscape Architecture, Tempe, 2004-2005
Board of Directors, Shade Projects, Phoenix, 2004-2006
Founder and Publisher, Shade Magazine, Phoenix, 2002-2006
Phoenix Arts Commission, Phoenix, 2002-2003
Chapter President, American Society of Media Photographers, Phoenix, 2002-2004
Instructor, Phoenix College in Guanajuato, Mexico, Summer 1996
Selected Exhibitions
Arts Organizations & Service

References

External links

 http://www.latimes.com/travel/la-tr-escape20mar20-story.html
Wayne Rainey's Buildings, Holgas and The monOrchid featured in The New York Times
Wayne Rainey in PDN Magazine's, "50 States"
Wayne Rainey's Building, The monOrchid in the New York Post
Wayne Rainey on the Cool List
Wayne Rainey featured in Art News
Wayne Rainey's fine-art series, "Africa" featured at Bentley Gallery
Wayne Rainey featured in "100 Creatives"
Wayne Rainey featured in Photo District News Photo Annual

1966 births
Living people
American photographers
Artists from Phoenix, Arizona